The Hollywood Saxons were a Los Angeles R&B group who recorded under various other names. They were well known on the LA R&B circuit. Their recording history ran from the late 1950s to the late 1960s. Their discography is complex due to the various names they recorded under and labels they recorded on.

Background
The group came about as a result of some basketball playing friends who would sing in the showers after a game. As a result of their singing and liking the activity, they formed a group. The group came to formation around midway through 1956. It consisted of Stan Beverly on lead, Bill Brooks on second tenor, Joe Lewis on Baritone, and Charles Taggart on bass. Bill Brooks left the group after nine months and was replaced by  Maudice Giles. The group increased to a five-man group with the addition of bass singer, Nathaniel "Buster" Wilson. Charles Taggart then became first tenor. They were first called The Saxons and it was Joe Lewis who came up with the name for the group. They were also known as The Tuxedos when they recorded for the Forte label and The Capris for their recordings on the Tender label.

Career

1950s to 1960s
In 1958, as The Capris, the group had recorded a slow rocka-ballad "Endless Love" which was released on the Tender label. The song was written by K.C. Reath and Robert Hafner. The B side "Beware" was credited to Jesse Belvin & the Capris. Some years later it was released on the Impact label with "Luau" as the B side recorded by The Charades. This Capris group is sometimes confused with a (white) New York group of the same name.

By December 1962, they had a single "I'm Your Man" bw "It's You" out on Elf label.

At some stage in the 1960s the group broke up. Some of the members, Stan Beverly, Joe Louis and Charles Taggart would later reunite to perform for Doo-Wop Society shows.

1970s to 1980s
As Speed Limit, Stan Beverly and Joe Lewis group recorded "There Goes My Baby" in 1972. Other singers on the recording were Carlton Beck on bass and Richard Botts on baritone.

After the mid-1970s, The Hollywood Saxons performed occasionally with the line up consisting of Stan Beverly, Joe Lewis, Maudice Giles and Bill Brooks. Beverly left at some stage to join one of the Ink Spots lineups. He was replaced by Melvin Ware.

2000s
In 2000, the Hollywood Saxons were still performing with the group featuring original members Stan Beverly and Joe Lewis.

Discography

Hollywood Saxons

The Capris

References

External links
 The Hollywood Saxons By Marv Goldberg
 ElectricEarl.com  The HOLLYWOOD SAXONS

African-American musical groups
American rhythm and blues musical groups
American vocal groups
Musical groups from California
Doo-wop groups
Musical groups established in 1956
1956 establishments in California
Impact Records (California) artists
Swingin' Records artists